Miss World 2008, the 58th edition of the Miss World pageant, was held on 13 December 2008 at the Sandton Convention Centre in Johannesburg, South Africa. Originally, the pageant was going to take place in Kyiv, Ukraine, but because of the ongoing 2008 Russo-Georgian diplomatic crisis in neighbouring South Ossetia, the Miss World Organization decided to move the pageant away from Eastern Europe. 109 contestants from all over the world compete for the crown, the second highest turnout in the 59 years of the pageant. Zhang Zilin of China crowned Ksenia Sukhinova of Russia as the brand new Miss World.

Results

Placements

Continental Queens of Beauty
Winners were as follows:

 Order of Announcements 

Top 15
 

Top 5

Contestants
Miss World 2008 had a total of 109 contestants.

Judges
Miss World 2008 contestants were judged based upon the criteria of glamour, beauty, intelligence and poise. Some of the judges were representatives of the Miss World Organization. Some of the contestants, such as Ksenia Sukhinova, communicated with the judges using a translator. Judges for the event were:
 Julia Morley – Chairwoman of the Miss World Organization.
 Wilnelia Merced – Miss World 1975 from Puerto Rico
 Aminurta Kang – Theatre stage director, China and North America
 Krish Naidoo – International ambassador for Miss World
 Pearl Luthuli – Group executive public commercial services SABC
 Lindiwe Mahlangu – Chief executive of the Joburg Tourism Company
 Precious Moloi-Motsepe – Chairperson of African Fashion International
 Graham Cooke – President of World Travel

Notes

Returns

Last competed in 1999:
 
Last competed in 2004:
 
 
 
Last competed in 2005:
 
Last competed in 2006:

Designations
  – Miss Thailand World was not held this year due to the death of Princess Galyani Vadhana, so last year's 1st runner-up, Ummarapas Jullakasian represented Thailand.

Replacements
  – Meriam George was replaced by Sanaa Ismail Hamed at the last minute for some undisclosed reasons.
  – Miss Hong Kong 2008 winner Edelweiss Cheung was replaced by the 1st runner-up, Skye Chan.
  – Janina San Miguel was replaced by Bb. Pilipinas 1st Runner-up, Danielle Castaño due to Janina's personal decision to give up her crown.
  – Jennifer Palm Lundberg placed 3rd Runner-up in the Miss World Sweden pageant, but won the title when each of the original top three placers declined the crown after disagreements over the winner's contract.
  – Miss Vietnam 2008 Trần Thị Thùy Dung was not allowed to compete after it was revealed that she did not graduate from high school. The 1st Runner-up Phan Hoàng Minh Thư and the 2nd Runner-up Nguyễn Thụy Vân also were not allowed to compete. After that, Dương Trương Thiên Lý, the 2nd Runner-up of Miss Universe Vietnam 2008 was designated to represent Vietnam.

Withdrawals
  – Due to lack of funding and sponsorship
  – Suzana Al-Salkini withdrew due to lack of funding and sponsorship, but she did compete the following year at Miss World 2009.
  – The organiser of the Miss Nepal pageant said it was postponing the contest scheduled for 23 August 2008 to an unknown date, after the Maoist women's wing, which has trained its sights on Miss Nepal, announced a Kathmandu Valley shutdown on the day to prevent the event.
  – Kathya Saldaña had problems with the regional organisation and didn't obtain a South African visa in time.
  – Due to lack of funding and sponsorship
  – Due to lack of funding and sponsorship
  – Mireille Nederbiel was not allowed to compete in Miss World by the decision of pageant organizers.

References

External links
 

Miss World
2008 in South Africa
2008 beauty pageants
Beauty pageants in South Africa
December 2008 events in South Africa
2000s in Johannesburg